The Buriganga River (Buŗigônga) is a river in Bangladesh which flows past the southwest outskirts of the capital city, Dhaka. It ranks among the most polluted rivers in the country.

Dhaleshwari River

According to R. C. Majumdar, in the distant past, it is probable that a course of the Ganges river used to reach the Bay of Bengal through the Dhaleshwari River. The Buriganga originated from the Dhaleshwari in the south of Savar, near Dhaka  In the 20th century the water table and river became polluted by polythenes and other hazardous substances from demolished buildings near the river banks.

Pollution

The Buriganga is economically very important to Dhaka. Launches and country boats provide connection to other parts of Bangladesh, a largely riverine country. When the Mughals made Dhaka their capital in 1610, the banks of the Buriganga were already a prime location for trade. The river was also the city's main source of drinking water.

Today, the Buriganga river is afflicted by the noisome problem of pollution. The chemical waste of mills and factories, household waste, medical waste, sewage, dead animals, plastics, and oil are some of the Buriganga's pollutants. The city of Dhaka discharges about 4,500 tons of solid waste every day and most of it is released into the Buriganga. According to the Department of Environment,  of toxic waste are released into the river by the tanneries every day. Experts identified nine industrial areas in and around the capital city as the primary sources of river pollution: Tongi, Tejgaon, Hazaribagh, Tarabo, Narayanganj, Savar, Gazipur, Dhaka Export Processing Zone and Ghorashal. Most of the industrial units of these areas have no sewage treatment or effluent treatment plants (ETPs) of their own.

The waste mostly comes from garment washing and dyeing plants. Textile industries annually discharge as much as 56 million tonnes of waste and 0.5 million tonnes of sludge. Sewage is also released into the Buriganga. A newspaper article from 2004 indicated that up to 80% of Dhaka's sewage was untreated. Because of Dhaka's heavy reliance on river transport for goods, including food, the Buriganga receives especially high amounts of food waste since unusable or rotting portions of fruits, vegetables, and fish are thrown into the river.

Nearly 4.0 million people of the city are exposed to the consequences of water pollution every day.

Gallery

See also
Fast fashion
Citarum River

References

External links
Youtube.com: Time lapse video of the Buriganga River

Rivers of Bangladesh
Geography of Dhaka
Dhaka District
Ganges basin
Environmental issues in Bangladesh
Rivers of Dhaka Division